Śliwiński (feminine: Śliwińska; plural: Śliwińscy) is a Polish surname. It comes from toponyms derived from the noun śliwa ("plum"). It may refer to:

 Andrzej Śliwiński (1939–2009), Polish Catholic bishop
 Arsen Śliwiński (born 1996), Polish sprint canoeist
 Artur Śliwiński (1877–1953), Prime Minister of Poland
 Edyta Śliwińska (born 1981), Polish ballroom dancer
 Jeanette Sliwinski (born 1982), American model
 Józef Śliwiński (born 1865), Polish classical pianist
 Michał Śliwiński (born 1970), Ukrainian-Polish sprint canoeist
 Renata Śliwińska (born 1996), Polish Paralympic athlete
 Ryan Sliwinski (born 2002), American White Male

See also
 
 

Polish-language surnames